Theodore Ian Wilson Aronson (13 November 1929 – 13 May 2003) was a royal biographer whose easy manner enabled him to earn the trust of his subjects.

He was the son of a Latvian Jewish storekeeper, born at Kirkwood, South Africa  and educated at Grey High School in Port Elizabeth before studying art at Cape Town University, where he acted with Nigel Hawthorne. He became a commercial artist with J. Walter Thompson in Johannesburg, then transferred to London, where he also worked part-time as a waiter. His interest in royalty began at a young age. He encountered members of the royal family at a siding near Kirkwood in 1947, and was impressed by Queen Elizabeth's charm. After visiting the mausoleum of Napoleon III at St Michael's Abbey in Farnborough, Hampshire, he decided to write about royal subjects. 

After a change of publisher, he 'was persuaded that dynastic studies were no longer required,' so he began to write studies of recent history regarding the British royal family. (The Times, 20 May 2003)

He was well versed in his subjects and became known as a devoted admirer of British royalty. His research included interviewing several members of the royal family, including Princess Alice, Countess of Athlone, about whom he published a biography in 1981, the Queen Mother, and Princess Margaret,  as well as numerous courtiers. 

He had written twenty-three books and appeared in several television documentaries. In his book Royal Subjects, he acknowledged that during his career as a writer, 'various Kings, and their families, have proved to be devilish good subjects for me,' and that being 'something of an outsider, unrestricted by the British class system' (Royal Subjects, pp. ix-x), had proved an advantage for him being granted almost unprecedented access to royal circles.

Aronson was the partner of historian Brian Roberts for over 40 years. He died from cancer at Frome in Somerset aged 73.

Books by Theo Aronson

The Golden Bees: The Story of the Bonapartes (New York Graphic Society - 1964)
Royal Vendetta: The Crown of Spain 1829-1965 (Bobbs-Merrill - 1966)
Defiant Dynasty: The Coburgs of Belgium (Littlehampton Book Services - 1969)
The Fall of the Third Napoleon (Bobbs-Merrill - 1970)
The Kaisers (Bobbs-Merrill - 1971)
Queen Victoria and the Bonapartes (Bobbs-Merrill - 1972)
Grandmama of Europe: The Crowned Descendants of Queen Victoria (Macmillan Publishing - 1974)
Royal Ambassadors: British Royalties in Southern Africa 1860-1947 (Littlehampton Book Services - 1975)
A Family of Kings: The Descendants of Christian IX of Denmark (Weidenfeld & Nicolson - 1976)
Victoria and Disraeli: The Making of a Romantic Partnership (Macmillan Publishing - 1978)
Kings Over the Water: The Saga of the Stuart Pretenders (Littlehampton Book Services - 1979)
Princess Alice, Countess of Athlone (Littlehampton Book Services - 1981)
Royal Family: Years of Transition (Salem House - 1984)
The King in Love: Edward VII's Mistresses: Lillie Langtry, Daisy Warwick, Alice Keppel and Others Harper Collins - 1988)
Crowns in Conflict: The Triumph of the Tragedy of European Monarchy 1910-1918 (Horizon Book - 1988)
Napoleon and Josephine: A Love Story (St. Martins Press - 1990)
Queen Victoria's Scotland (with Michael J. Stead, Cassell Illustrated - 1992)
Heart of a Queen: Queen Victoria's Romantic Attachments (John Murray Publishers - 1992)
The Royal Family at War (John Murray Publishers - 1994)Prince Eddy and the Homosexual Underworld (John Murray Publishers - 1996)Princess Margaret: A Biography (Regnery Publishing - 1997)Royal Subjects: A Biographer's Encounters (Sidgwick & Jackson - 2000)A Family of Kings'' (Royalty Digest - 2004)

References

1929 births
2003 deaths
Michaelis School of Fine Art alumni
British biographers
British people of Latvian descent
Deaths from cancer in England
Naturalised citizens of the United Kingdom
South African emigrants to the United Kingdom
University of Cape Town alumni
20th-century biographers